Destruction is a professional wrestling event promoted by New Japan Pro-Wrestling (NJPW) annually since 2007. In 2017, NJPW produced three events under the Destruction name; Destruction in Fukushima on September 10, Destruction in Hiroshima on September 16, and Destruction in Kobe on September 24. These were events fifteen to seventeen under the Destruction name.

Production

Background
2017 was the second consecutive year in which NJPW held three events under the Destruction name. From 2007 to 2013, NJPW held one Destruction event per year, expanding to two shows in 2014 and 2015 and to three shows in 2016.

The three shows aired live through NJPW's internet streaming service, NJPW World, with English commentary provided for the Hiroshima and Kobe events.

Storylines
The Destruction shows featured professional wrestling matches, each of which involved different wrestlers from pre-existing scripted feuds and storylines. Wrestlers portrayed villains, heroes, or less distinguishable characters in the scripted events that built tension and culminated in a wrestling match or series of matches.

Destruction in Fukushima would be headlined by Minoru Suzuki making his third defense of the NEVER Openweight Championship against Michael Elgin. This match stemmed from the 2017 G1 Climax, where Elgin defeated Suzuki, challenging him to a title match afterwards. On September 7, Suzuki and Elgin agreed to turn the match into a lumberjack deathmatch, which was made official the following day. The show would also feature Chaos' Kazuchika Okada, Rocky Romero and Toru Yano challenging Los Ingobernables de Japón'''s Bushi, Evil and Sanada for the NEVER Openweight 6-Man Tag Team Championship. The match would mark IWGP Heavyweight Champion Okada's first-ever shot at the title and also served as a prelude to Evil challenging him for the Heavyweight title on October 9 at King of Pro-Wrestling.

Destruction in Hiroshima would be headlined by Hiroshi Tanahashi making his second IWGP Intercontinental Championship defense against Zack Sabre Jr. During the 2017 G1 Climax, Sabre put himself in title contention by scoring two submission wins over Tanahashi, first in their opening tournament match on July 17 and again in a non-tournament six-man tag team match on August 13. In the semi-main event, Sabre's Suzuki-gun stablemate El Desperado would challenge Kushida for the IWGP Junior Heavyweight Championship in the champion's second title defense. El Desperado defeated Kushida during the 2017 Best of the Super Juniors and on June 27, after Kushida had successfully defended the IWGP Junior Heavyweight Championship against Bushi, hit him with a guitar and challenged him to a title match. While Kushida was absent from the G1 Climax tour, El Desperado made repeated challenges towards him. When the two finally met on August 12, El Desperado hit Kushida with his own title belt, which he then proceeded to steal. The show would also feature Suzuki-gun, with Taichi and Yoshinobu Kanemaru challenging Funky Future (Ricochet and Ryusuke Taguchi) for the IWGP Junior Heavyweight Tag Team Championship. In addition, the show would feature Roppongi Vice's final match together as a tag team. After unsuccessfully challenging then IWGP Junior Heavyweight Tag Team Champions The Young Bucks (Matt Jackson and Nick Jackson) for the title on July 2, Roppongi Vice agreed to disband with Rocky Romero giving Beretta his blessing to move to the heavyweight division.

Destruction in Kobe would be headlined by Kenny Omega defending the IWGP United States Heavyweight Championship against Juice Robinson. This match also stemmed from the 2017 G1 Climax, where Robinson picked up a win over Omega, asking for a shot at his IWGP United States Heavyweight Championship in a post-match interview. With Omega having won the tournament on July 2 to become the inaugural IWGP United States Heavyweight Champion, this match would mark the first-ever defense of the title. Omega was scheduled to participate in the entire tour, but on September 6, it was announced that he had suffered a knee injury and was pulled from shows between September 7 and 22. He was replaced by the debuting Leo Tonga, the youngest brother of Tama Tonga and Tanga Loa. Several matches on the Kobe card were changed following events that took place at the Hiroshima show.

In addition to these title matches, all three shows would also feature a three-way tag team match for the IWGP Tag Team Championship with War Machine (Hanson and Raymond Rowe) taking on Killer Elite Squad (Davey Boy Smith Jr. and Lance Archer) and Guerrillas of Destiny (Tama Tonga and Tanga Loa). The first two matches would take place under regular three-way rules, while the third match would be contested under tornado tag team match rules. After successfully defending the title against Bullet Club's Cody and Hangman Page on August 13, War Machine were confronted and challenged to a title rematch by Guerrillas of Destiny. However, before they could respond, both teams were attacked by the Killer Elite Squad. This marked a return for K.E.S., who had not been seen together since the previous February, when Archer was sidelined with a lumbar disc herniation.

Reception
Destruction in Fukushima
Bryan Rose of the Wrestling Observer Newsletter wrote that Destruction in Fukushima was "one of the weaker cards New Japan has put out this year, topped by a main event that was one of the worst New Japan main events in I don't know how long". Larry Csonka of 411Mania had similar sentiments, calling the show "extremely disappointing" and "possibly the laziest, most lifeless show the promotion has put on all year". He rated the main event a "dud", calling it "an embarrassment". Dave Meltzer, also of the Wrestling Observer Newsletter, wrote that fan response to the show had been "very negative, by far the worst of any major show for the company this year".

Destruction in Hiroshima
The show was better received than its predecessor. Larry Csonka of 411Mania wrote that Destruction in Hiroshima "wasn't a great show, but it was closer to the company getting back to form" after the Fukushima show. Bryan Rose of the Wrestling Observer Newsletter wrote that the Hiroshima show exceeded the Fukushima show "pretty much in every way".

Destruction in Kobe
Bryan Rose of the Wrestling Observer Newsletter called the show "just there", deeming everything but the two title matches and the match between Beretta and Yujiro Takahashi "skippable". Rose praised the main event of the show as "fantastic". Larry Csonka of 411Mania'' rated the show "good". While being down on the first three matches, he praised the main event as a "must see".

Results

Destruction in Fukushima

Destruction in Hiroshima

Destruction in Kobe

References

External links
Destruction (2017) at NJPW.co.jp

2017
2017 in professional wrestling
September 2017 events in Japan